Eugenie Bouchard was the defending champion, having won the event in 2012, but decided not to participate in 2013.

Victoria Duval won the tournament when Tímea Babos retired having lost the first set 7–5.

Seeds

Main draw

Finals

Top half

Bottom half

References 
 Main draw

Tevlin Women's Challenger
Tevlin Women's Challenger